John Devine (9 July 1933 - May 2017) was an English former footballer who played as a winger and made a professional appearance with Chester.

Devine played for Rhyl until joining Chester in 1955, with goalkeeper John Griffiths making the same move. But whereas Griffiths was to make more than 50 league appearances for the club, Devine was to be restricted to a solitary first team outing. It came on 30 March 1956 in a 2–0 home win over Halifax Town, with Devine wearing the number seven shirt in place of regular George Allman.

He later returned to non–league football when he joined New Brighton.

Bibliography

References

1933 births
2017 deaths
English Football League players
English footballers
Association football wingers
Rhyl F.C. players
Chester City F.C. players
New Brighton A.F.C. players
Footballers from Liverpool